The year 2001 is the 1st year in the history of World Extreme Cagefighting, a mixed martial arts promotion based in the United States. In 2001 WEC held 2 events beginning with, WEC 1: Princes of Pain.

Events list

WEC 2: Clash of the Titans

WEC 2: Clash of the Titans was an event held on October 4, 2001 at the Tachi Palace in Lemoore, California, United States.

Results

WEC 1: Princes of Pain

WEC 1: Princes of Pain was an event held on June 30, 2001 at the Tachi Palace in Lemoore, California, United States.

Results

See also 
 World Extreme Cagefighting
 List of WEC events

References

World Extreme Cagefighting events
2001 in mixed martial arts